The Algerian Cup semi-finals are played to determine which teams will contest the Algerian Cup Final.

Location

Format

Records

List of Algerian Cup semi-finals

Semi Final Key

1960s

1970s

1980s

1990s

2000s

2010s

Semi-finals table 
Teams shown with an asterisk beside their name are no longer in existence. This table is updated as per the first Semi-final of the 2018–19 Algerian Cup.

Venues
Venues that no longer exist or regularly host football are denoted with an asterisk.

See also
Algerian Cup
Algerian Cup Final

References

Semi-finals